Anfernee Tyrik Simons (born June 8, 1999) is an American professional basketball player for the Portland Trail Blazers of the National Basketball Association (NBA). He played prep basketball for IMG Academy in Bradenton, Florida. He became the first American to enter and be selected in an NBA draft directly after graduating from high school since the league first implemented age restriction rules in 2005.

High school career
Simons first attended Edgewater High School in Orlando, Florida, where during his sophomore year he averaged 17.8 points, 4.6 assists, 2.4 rebounds, and 1 steal per game in 30 games. During his junior year he transferred to Montverde Academy in Montverde, but after being a bench player, returned to Edgewater with the intention of holding his name back from college consideration for a year. He graduated from Edgewater in 2017, averaging 23.8 points, 7.2 rebounds, 4.2 assists, 1.8 steals, and 0.5 blocks per game in 20 games played in his last year there. Then, because of his reclassification in the Class of 2018, he attended the IMG Academy in Bradenton for a postgraduate year, although he had previously expressed interest in spending that year at the West Oaks Academy in Orlando instead. During the summer of 2017, he also played for the United States men's national under-19 basketball team.

Simons was rated as a five-star recruit and was ranked as the 7th best player in the 2018 class by 247Sports.com. Originally, he planned to enter the University of Louisville, but as a result of the basketball sex scandal of 2015 at the university and its involvement in the 2017–18 NCAA Division I men's basketball corruption scandal, he ultimately decommitted from Louisville, saying that he was most interested in the University of South Carolina, North Carolina State University, the University of Tennessee, and the University of Florida. In January 2018, he then said that he was "most likely" going to bypass college and enter the 2018 NBA Draft, albeit without hiring an agent. In March 2018 he confirmed his decision, and later removed his name from the 2018 Nike Hoop Summit and Jordan Brand Classic. On March 20, 2018, ESPN ranked him as the 19th best prospect in the draft. Simons was later named one of the 69 players invited to the 2018 NBA Draft Combine that year.

Professional career

Portland Trail Blazers (2018–present)
Simons was selected 24th overall by the Portland Trail Blazers in the 2018 NBA draft. He would be the third high school player since 2015 to be drafted in the NBA, behind Thon Maker and Satnam Singh Bhamara. On July 2, 2018, the Trail Blazers announced that they had signed Simons.

On January 21, 2019, the Blazers assigned Simons to the Agua Caliente Clippers for an NBA G League assignment.

On April 10, 2019, Simons had his first career start against the Sacramento Kings while the Trail Blazers rested Damian Lillard and CJ McCollum for the final game of the regular season. Simons put up career highs across the board with 37 points, 6 rebounds, and 9 assists, becoming the first Trail Blazers rookie to score 30+ points since Lillard.

In the championship round of the Slam Dunk Contest during halftime of the 2021 NBA All-Star Game, Simons attempted to kiss the rim, but failed and still completed the dunk. Despite his failed attempt, he was named the 2021 Slam Dunk Champion in a 3-2 decision.

On January 3, 2022, Simons scored a then career-high 43 points behind nine three-pointers, along with seven assists, in a 136–131 win over the Atlanta Hawks. In a postgame interview, he dedicated the game to his grandfather who died of cancer the previous night. On March 28, he was ruled out for the remainder of the season with patellar tendinopathy in his left knee.

On July 6, 2022, Simons re-signed with the Trail Blazers on a four-year, $100 million contract. On October 21, Simons hit a game-winning floater in a 113–111 overtime win over the Phoenix Suns. On December 3, Simons scored a  career-high 45 points in a 116–111 win over the Utah Jazz. On February 3, 2023, Simons scored 33 points in a 124–116 comeback win over the Washington Wizards.

Career statistics

NBA

Regular season

|-
| style="text-align:left;"| 
| style="text-align:left;"| Portland
| 20 || 1 || 7.1 || .444 || .345 || .563 || .7 || .7 || .1 || .0 || 3.8
|- class="sortbottom"
|-
| style="text-align:left;"| 
| style="text-align:left;"| Portland
| 70 || 4 || 20.7 || .399 || .332 || .826 || 2.2 || 1.4 || .4 || .1 || 8.3
|- class="sortbottom"
|-
| style="text-align:left;"| 
| style="text-align:left;"| Portland
| 64 || 0 || 17.3 || .419 || .426 || .807 || 2.2 || 1.4 || .3 || .1 || 7.8
|-
| style="text-align:left;"| 
| style="text-align:left;"| Portland
| 57 || 30 || 29.5 || .443 || .405 || .888 || 2.6 || 3.9 || .5 || .1 || 17.3
|- class="sortbottom"
| style="text-align:center;" colspan="2"| Career
| 211 || 35 || 20.7 || .425 || .392 || .833 || 2.2 || 2.0 || .4 || .1 || 10.2

Playoffs

|-
| align="left" | 2019
| align="left" | Portland
| 5 || 0 || 2.4 || .000 || .000 || .800 || .0 || .0 || .2 || .0 || .8
|-
| align="left" | 2020
| align="left" | Portland
| 4 || 0 || 20.5 || .305 || .429 || .833 || 2.8 || 2.5 || 1.5 || .0 || 6.8
|-
| align="left" | 2021
| align="left" | Portland
| 6 || 0 || 17.8 || .560 || .611 || .000 || 2.7 || .8 || .3 || .2 || 6.5
|- class="sortbottom"
| style="text-align:center;" colspan="2"| Career
| 15 || 0 || 13.4 || .379 || .500 || .818 || 1.8 || 1.0 || .6 || .1 || 4.7

Personal life 
Simons was given the name Anfernee due to his parents, Charles and Tameka, being fans of the Orlando Magic and naming him after former player Penny Hardaway. Hardaway coached Simons during a Team USA Basketball training camp.

References

External links

1999 births
Living people
African-American basketball players
Agua Caliente Clippers players
American men's basketball players
Basketball players from Florida
Edgewater High School alumni
IMG Academy alumni
McDonald's High School All-Americans
Montverde Academy alumni
National Basketball Association high school draftees
People from Altamonte Springs, Florida
Portland Trail Blazers draft picks
Portland Trail Blazers players
Shooting guards
Sportspeople from Seminole County, Florida
21st-century African-American sportspeople